Goodman's conjecture on the coefficients of multivalent functions was proposed in complex analysis in 1948 by Adolph Winkler Goodman, an American mathematician.

Formulation 
Let  be a -valent function. The conjecture claims the following coefficients hold:

Partial results 

External sources 

Complex analysis
Conjectures